This is a list of the highest known prices paid for sculptures.

Most valuable sculpture
Alberto Giacometti's L'Homme au doigt was auctioned for $141.3m at Christie's in May 2015, the highest price for any sculpture at auction.

Giacometti's L'Homme qui marche I had previously achieved the highest price of any sculpture when it was auctioned by Sotheby's in February 2010.  Selling for US$104.3 million, it ranks amongst the most valuable works of art.

In 2005, Constantin Brâncuși's Bird in Space broke records when it sold for $27.5 million. The previous world record was another work by Brâncuși called Danaide, which was sold for $18.1 million in May 2002.  The 2005 record stood for two years until a highly regarded work of antiquity surpassed the price. Artemis and the Stag, found in the 1920s at a Roman construction site, fetched $28.6 million in June 2007.  The record would only stand for a few months, with a work by Pablo Picasso, Tete de femme (Dora Maar), surpassing it by half a million US dollars in November 2007.

In December 2007, the sale of the Guennol Lioness, a statue from around 3000 BC, nearly doubled the previous record price when it sold for $57.2 million. It is the fifth-most valuable sculpture to date (2018) and the most valuable piece from antiquity.

Damien Hirst has claimed that his sculpture For the Love of God, which consists of a platinum cast of a human skull encrusted with 8,601 flawless diamonds, was sold for £50 million (around US$75 million) in August 2007.  The truth of this private sale, which was to an unknown consortium, has been called into question. If the sale did take place, For the Love of God would become the second-most expensive sculpture ever sold and would have fetched the highest price for a sculpture by a living artist.

2010 was a good year for record-breaking sculpture prices but it did not continue into 2011. Jeff Koons' porcelain Pink Panther was estimated to fetch a value of up to $30 million, but only achieved just over half that.

Louise Bourgeois holds the record ($32.1 million in 2019) for Spider, the highest price paid for an attributable sculpture by a woman (since the sculptor of Guennol Lioness is unknown).

Auction details
All the most expensive sculptures have been sold by one of two auction houses: Sotheby's and Christie's. Sotheby's has hosted the auctions of the two works that reached the highest price, one in London and the other in New York.  Only three of the top ten have auctioned outside of New York; one in London and two in Paris.

The top ten highest value sculptures were made by seven different people, two of whom are unknown and will never be identified. An Alberto Giacometti sculpture is the most valuable modern work, and he has three more entries in the top ten. Four Constantin Brâncuși sculptures are featured on the list, and Jeff Koons' work appears three times. Although Pablo Picasso only appears once he appears numerous times in the list of most expensive paintings.

Several buyers have chosen to remain anonymous, while others publicly celebrate their purchases.

Most expensive sculpture by a female artist 
Louise Bourgeois’ 1996 Spider is the most expensive sculpture by a woman artist, and last sold for $32.1 million in 2019.

List of highest prices paid
The highest prices paid for sculptures :

See also
List of most expensive paintings
List of most expensive photographs
List of most expensive artworks by living artists
List of most expensive books and manuscripts
List of most expensive non-fungible tokens

Notes

References

Sculpture
sculptures
sculptures
expensive